Aghios Nikolaos ( Μεσσηνίας), Agios Nikolaos or Saint Nicholas, is a fishing village in the Mani Peninsula in southern Greece; it is popular with holidaymakers. It is part of the municipal unit of West Mani in Messenia. The beautiful village of Agios Nikolaos is ideally located in the heart of the Mani peninsula and therefore other villages can be reached easily and quickly.

Aghios Nikolaos 
The population of Agios Nikolaos and of similar fishing villages in this part of Greece fell rapidly in the decades after World War II through emigration, mainly to Australia, but since the road from Kalamata was built in the late 1960s the tourist business brought prosperity to the area. Agios Nikolaos still has few tourist amenities, but the hills above the town offer Byzantine churches and views of the Gulf and of the Taygetus mountains further inland.

Over the last few decades, Agios Nikolaos has been rapidly evolved into a top tourist destination in Messenia and in the Mani peninsula in particular. However, it is still a picturesque and an active fishing harbour with a fish market most days. As fas as the accommodation is concerned, luxury stone villas with all the amenities can host a great number of tourists and visitors during the summer period. Additionally, there are several Tavernas and Kafeneia (cafés) around the harbour as well as tourist shops. There is also an emergency medical center (est. 2004), a pharmacy, a post office, and several small grocery stores. Lastly, there is also a small lighthouse (5m) situated in the west edge of the village.

Agios Nikolaos was formerly called Selinitsa (meaning simply village, settlement). The name Selinitsa is still used by many locals. It was a theatre of battles during the Greek Civil War, being on the side of Government fighting the 'communists' who were mainly in the mountain villages. There are no documented ancient remains in the immediate area.

Interesting facts 
The famous Greek poet Nikiforos Vrettakos used to spend his summer vacations at his wife's house in the village of Agios Nikolaos.

It has to be mentioned that Ioannis Giannouleas, a rich merchant and businessman from the Outer (Exo) Mani, donated a large parcel of land along the sea to the then Municipality of Mani for the purpose of the erection of the village's cemetery. Today, there is a plaque with his name engraved in the cemetery, commemorating his generous donation.

Notable Personalities 
Some notable people who are from Agios Nikolaos are listed below (indicatively):

 Ioannis Giannouleas (Greek: Ιωάννης Γιαννουλέας, 1890–1933), rich merchant and businessman of the Outer (Exo) Mani and benefactor of the village.
 Dimitrios I. Giannouleas (Greek: Δημήτριος Ι. Γιαννουλέας, 1919–2010), Lieutenant Commander of the Greek Navy and World War II Veteran. In 1941, he sailed with the Greek Navy to the Egyptian port of Alexandria, in order to continue the fight against the Axis powers, on the side of the Allies.
 Grigorios Skalkeas (Greek: Γρηγόριος Σκαλκέας, 1928–2018), prominent doctor and academic. He was the doctor of the former Prime Minister of Greece, Andreas Papandreou.

Notes

References

External links
Webcam

Mani Peninsula
Populated places in Messenia